Mahkota is the Malay word for "crown" and may refer to:

Allah Selamatkan Sultan Mahkota, the state anthem of Kedah, Malaysia
Bandar Indera Mahkota, new township in Kuantan, Pahang, Malaysia
Bandar Mahkota Cheras, township in Cheras, Selangor, Malaysia
Kembara Mahkota Johor, annual royal motorcycle tour program held by the state government of Johor
Putra Mahkota Interchange, major interchange of the North-South Expressway Southern Route in Malaysia
Teluk Mahkota, prominent bay on the east coast of the state of Johor, in Peninsular Malaysia
Tunku Abdul Rahman (Tunku Mahkota of Johor) (1933–1989), the younger son of Sultan Ismail of Johor, Malaysia